Orsolya Szilágyi was a Hungarian noblewoman from the  House of Szilágyi, she was the daughter of count László (Ladislaus) Szilágyi and Katalin Bellyéni. Orsolya Szilágyi was the wife of John Rozgonyi, which was voivode of Transylvania between 1441–1458 and between 1459–1461 (for the second time), also ispán of Sopron and Vas Counties (1449–1454), count of the Székelys (1457–1458). They had the following children: John, András, István, Apollónia (who married Benedek Csáky).

References

Sources
(Hungarian) Engel, Pál (1996). Magyarország világi archontológiája, 1301–1457, I. ("Secular Archontology of Hungary, 1301–1457, Volume I"). História, MTA Történettudományi Intézete. Budapest. .
(Hungarian) Markó, László (2000). A magyar állam főméltóságai Szent Istvántól napjainkig: Életrajzi Lexikon ("Great Officers of State in Hungary from King Saint Stephen to Our Days: A Biographical Encyclopedia"). Magyar Könyvklub. 
Engel, Pál (2001). The Realm of St Stephen: A History of Medieval Hungary, 895–1526. I.B. Tauris Publishers. .

Orsolya
15th-century Hungarian people
15th-century Hungarian women
15th-century Hungarian nobility
Medieval Hungarian nobility